The following is a list of film directors associated with making punk films:

 Abiola Abrams
 Greg Araki
 Sadie Benning
 Anonymous Boy
 Lynn Breedlove
 Tammy Rae Carland
 Billy Childish
 Wolf Howard
 Alex Cox
 Vaginal Davis
 Vivienne Dick
 Wynne Greenwood
 Sogo Ishii
 Sarah Jacobson
 Derek Jarman
 G. B. Jones
 Miranda July
 Lech Kowalski
 Richard Kern
 Bruce LaBruce
 Don Letts
 Juliana Lueking
 Jackson Low
 Leslie Mah
 David Markey
 James Merendino
 Eric Mitchell (filmmaker)
 John Cameron Mitchell
 Jon Moritsugu
 Amos Poe
 Jesse Richards
 Susan Seidelman
 Harris Smith
 Jean Smith
 Martin Sorrondeguy
 Penelope Spheeris
 James Spooner
 Julien Temple
 Lucy Thane
 Tõnu Trubetsky
 Nicholas Watson
 Brad Will
 Nick Zedd
 Mu Tunc

Punk